1992 in Armenian football was the first season of independent football after the split-up from the Soviet Union. The league existed of two groups with 12 teams each. The top six of each group qualified for the Championship stage, while the others participated in the relegation stage. FC Shirak and Homenetmen Yerevan shared the championship as they both finished on 37 points in the Championship stage.

Premier League
Koshkagorts Yerevan had its name changed to Shengavit FC.
Pahatsoyagorts Noyemberyan had its name changed to Aznavour FC.

First stage, Group 1

First stage, Group 2

Second stage, Championship Group
The qualified teams kept their head-to-head results to participate in the Championship stage, resulting in the following starting table.

Final table

Second stage, Relegation Group
The qualified teams kept their head-to-head results to participate in the Championship stage, resulting in the following starting table.

Final table

Top goalscorers

First League

First stage, Group 1

First stage, Group 2

Second stage, Championship Group

Second stage, Relegation Group

Armenian Cup

Quarterfinals

Semifinals

Final

National Team
Armenia played one international game in 1992.

Armenia vs Moldova

Notes

External links
 RSSSF: Armenia 1992